Tech City College (Formerly STEM Academy) is a free school sixth form located in the Islington area of the London Borough of Islington, England.

It originally opened in September 2013 as STEM Academy Tech City and specialised in Science, Technology, Engineering and Maths (STEM) and the Creative Application of Maths and Science. In September 2015 STEM Academy joined the Aspirations Academy Trust was renamed Tech City College. Tech City College offers A-levels and BTECs as programmes of study for students.

References

External links
Tech City College official website

Free schools in London
Education in the London Borough of Islington
Educational institutions established in 2013
Mathematics education in the United Kingdom
2013 establishments in England